Ghost Soldiers: The Epic Account of World War II's Greatest Rescue Mission (Doubleday, 2001) is a non-fiction book written by Hampton Sides. It is about the World War II Allied prison camp raid at Cabanatuan in the Philippines.

Synopsis 
In late January 1945, 121 Ranger volunteers set out to attempt a rescue of over 513 Allied prisoners of war in a Japanese camp near the Philippine city of Cabanatuan. The prisoners, survivors of the Bataan Death March, had lived in deplorable conditions for three years, suffering from starvation, tropical diseases, and abuse from Japanese soldiers. Ghost Soldiers recounts the story of the prisoners, the Ranger unit performing the raid, and the Filipino guerrillas who provided assistance. A massacre of American soldiers at Palawan alerted U.S. commanders to the danger of mass POW murder as the Japanese retreated from the Philippines. As a consequence, they planned and executed a mission to rescue the POWs from Cabanatuan prison camp. Ghost Soldiers provides historical background to the events leading to the raid, detailed accounts of camp conditions, the prisoners' heroic will to survive, and the planning and successful execution of the rescue.

Film adaptation 
The movie The Great Raid was partially based on Ghost Soldiers, along with William Breuer's The Great Raid on Cabanatuan.
The movie I Was an American Spy was based on the exploits of Claire Phillips, an American spy undercover as a cabaret owner in Manila.

Awards and honors
2001 New York Times bestseller, Nonfiction #7
2001 Amazon.com Best Books, Top 25 Editors' Favorites, #4
2002 PEN Center USA Literary Awards, Research Nonfiction

Reviews 
New York Times, “Books Of The Times"; A Heroic Military Rescue After the Hell of Bataan” 
Kirkus Reviews; “An extraordinary tale of bravery under fire and the will to endure…”

See also 
Raid at Cabanatuan
Bataan Death March
Henry Mucci

References

External links 
Esquire; “The untold story of an epic mission and the army rangers who pulled off the most dramatic secret raid of World War II.”
USA Today; “Ghost Soldiers: The Forgotten Epic Story of World War II’s Most Dramatic Mission”
Booknotes interview with Sides on Ghost Soldiers, September 30, 2001.
Presentation by Sides on Ghost Soldiers', Santa Fe Festival of the Book, October 13, 2001

History books about World War II
Bataan Death March
2001 non-fiction books
Anchor Books books
Prisoners of war in popular culture
Non-fiction books about the United States Army